Silene indica, the Indian campion, is a species of flowering plant in the family Caryophyllaceae, native to northern Pakistan, the Himalayas, and southern Tibet.

Subtaxa
The following varieties are accepted:

References

indica
Flora of Pakistan
Flora of West Himalaya
Flora of East Himalaya
Flora of Nepal
Flora of Tibet
Plants described in 1824